Roberts Creek is a community in the Sunshine Coast region of British Columbia, Canada. It is located in Area "D" of the Sunshine Coast Regional District.

Roberts Creek sits roughly halfway between the Town of Gibsons and the District of Sechelt, the two main population centres on the southern Sunshine Coast.

History
To the Indigenous peoples of both the Squamish and Shishalh, Roberts Creek served as the border between the two peoples. Due to the several creeks that drain into the Strait of Georgia which offer seasonal runs of salmon, the native peoples chose to settle in Roberts Creek many centuries prior to European settlers.

Roberts Creek is named for William Roberts, the first European settler in the area. During the 1960s many draft evaders from the U.S. settled in Roberts Creek.  It is also well known for several communes formed during this time period.

Infrastructure
"Downtown" Roberts Creek is located at the beach, where Lower Road, Roberts Creek Road and Beach Avenue meet. It is home to the elementary school, the Royal Canadian Legion Branch 219, a post office, library, Ambrosia Organic Living health food store, The Heart Gardens, Roberts Creek General Store, Inside Passage School of Fine Cabinetmaking, Yoga by the Sea, MELOmania music shop, Creek Massage, Elfinstones Rock and Gem Shop, The Gumboot Cafe and the Gumboot Restaurant, and other businesses. Up the Creek Backpackers B&B is up Roberts Creek Road toward Highway 101. The volunteer fire department and Roberts Creek Hall, home to live music, dances, community events and craft fairs, are situated at the top of Roberts Creek Road at the highway.

The Roberts Creek Provincial Park is a popular campground. Roberts Creek is also home to several beaches including Roberts Creek Beach (bottom of Roberts Creek Road), the Roberts Creek Picnic Site (bottom of Flume Road at Beach Avenue), Henderson Beach and Stephens beach.

The province completed the installation of she shashishalhem-English dual-language road signs along Highway 101. Roberts Creek can be located by its traditional name, xwesam.

Government
Roberts Creek is an unincorporated community. It is represented in the Sunshine Coast Regional District by a regional director, currently (2022) Kelly Backs, past (2019) Andreas Tize (since October 2018). Roberts Creek is a part of School District No. 46 (Sunshine Coast).

Demographics
According to the 2016 census, the total population of the electoral area of Roberts Creek was 3,421. The population density was 23.8 people per square kilometre (143.6/km²). There were 1,508 occupied private dwellings. The population grew by 5.5% from the 2011 census.

The 2016 census identified two separate areas: the 'Population centre' ['PC']; and the 'Designated place' ['DP']. The population centre had a population of 1,848; while the designated place had 1,867 people. Despite a nearly-equal population, the land area of the "Downtown" incorporated population centre (3.93/km²) is much smaller than the unincorporated part of town (20.97/km²). Like in many small West Coast Canadian communities, the average age in Roberts Creek (46.4 PC, 45.8 DP) is older than the national average (41.0 years).

Arts and culture

Roberts Creek has a vibrant arts community, including a yearly Art Crawl, and a collection of accomplished artists and writers.

Roberts Creek's annual festival, Creek Daze, is held in early August and includes the Higgledy-Piggledy parade, a second-hand book sale in support of the notable local library, live music at the beach mandala and sales tables with crafts and food. Live music, craft shows and other events are held regularly at the community centre, Roberts Creek Hall. Live music and film events are held at the Gumboot Cafe (snacks and beverages), next door to the newer Gumboot Restaurant, which serves full meals.

Earth Day is held at the beach in April and is a popular event with the locals. Speakers, info tables and music celebrate the Earth and humanity's relationship with it.

The Day Out of Time Celebration is held on July 25 of each year. It is preceded by the yearly painting of the Roberts Creek Mandala (an all ages community art project), and culminates in a yearly dedication of the new mandala with a unique and inspiring community dance.

Roberts Creek is known for its horse area above the Highway 101, with riding trails all over the mountains, including a main feeder route to Electric Ranch. A horse arena club entertains the public at intervals at the end of this route on B+K Road. Many hundreds of horses use this route.

EEK! the Creek, an annual Halloween celebration includes a Zombie Walk, Grave Decorating Competition and Online Community Story Writing Contest is sponsored by Roberts Creek Community Association

Notable people
Julia Budd (born 1983), mixed martial artist

References

External links
Xwesam Roberts Creek Volunteer Fire Department
Roberts Creek Legion
Roberts Creek / SCRD Website
 Roberts Creek

Unincorporated settlements in British Columbia
Populated places in the Sunshine Coast Regional District
Designated places in British Columbia